The Place to Bleed is the third album of the German horror punk band The Other, released in 2008.

Track listing
"Welcome "
"Become Undead"
"The End Of Our Time"
"Der Tod Steht Dir Gut"
"Bleed"
"Freak Liberation Front"
"The Creature From The Black Lagoon"
"Black Angel"
"Moonlight Mayhem"
"Return To The House Of Usher"
"The Murder In The House Of Wax"
"The Change In Me"
"Graveyard Rodeo"
"The Dark World Order"

Personnel
 Rod Usher (Vocals)
 Sarge von Rock (Guitar)
 Migore Drake (Bass)
 Dr. Caligari (Drums)

2008 albums
The Other (band) albums